Športno društvo Ižakovci, commonly referred to as ŠD Ižakovci or simply Ižakovci, is a Slovenian football club that plays in the village of Ižakovci. Their main colours are yellow and green. They play in the 1. MNL, the fifth tier of the Slovenian football pyramid. They are currently named NK Aqua Ižakovci due to sponsorship reasons.

Honours
Slovenian Third Division
 Winners: 1991–92

Slovenian Fifth Division
 Winners: 2004–05

League history since 1991

References

Football clubs in Slovenia
Association football clubs established in 1975
1975 establishments in Slovenia